Yang Xianyi (January 10, 1915 – November 23, 2009) was a Chinese literary translator, known for rendering many ancient and a few modern Chinese classics into English, including Dream of the Red Mansions.

Life and career
Born into a wealthy banking family in Tianjin, he was sent to Merton College, Oxford to study Classics in 1936. There he married Gladys Tayler. They had two daughters and a son, who committed suicide in 1979.

Yang and his wife returned to China in 1940, and began their decades long co-operation of introducing Chinese classics to the English-speaking world. Working for the Foreign Languages Press in Beijing, a government-funded publisher, the husband and wife team produced a number of quality translations. The works translated include classical Chinese poetry; such classic works as A Dream of the Red Mansions, The Scholars, Liu E's Mr. Decadent: Notes Taken in an Outing, also known as The Travels of Lao Can, and some of Lu Xun's stories.

Yang was also the first one to render the Odyssey into Chinese (prose) from the ancient Greek original. He also translated Aristophanes's Ornithes, Virgil's Georgics, La chanson de Roland and Bernard Shaw's Pygmalion into Chinese.

He narrowly escaped being labeled a "rightist" in 1957-58 for his frank speaking. However, Yang and his wife Gladys were imprisoned for four years as "class enemies" in 1968 during the Cultural Revolution. Gladys died in 1999.

He was also noted for writing doggerel. His autobiography, White Tiger, was published in 2003.

After Yang Xianyi died in 2009, his youngest sister, translator Yang Yi, compiled and edited a book including poetry translated by her late brother. In 2022, a new edition was released by Chinese Translation Publishing House, called Brother–Sister Translated Poems (兄妹译诗) or Translated Poems by Yang Xianyi and Yang Yi, featuring more than 100 of their favorite poems.

References

Further reading
 Yang Xianyi, White Tiger: An Autobiography of Yang Xianyi, Hong Kong: The Chinese University Press, 2002

External links

Alumni of Merton College, Oxford
People's Republic of China translators
Chinese–English translators
1915 births
2009 deaths
Translators to Chinese
Writers from Tianjin
Republic of China translators
Educators from Tianjin
Academic staff of Chongqing University
Victims of the Cultural Revolution
20th-century Chinese translators
21st-century Chinese translators
Literary translators
Translators of Homer
Translators of Virgil
Chinese magazine founders